Towpath Mountain is a mountain in Schoharie County, New York. It is located north-northwest of Breakabeen. Walhalla Rocks is located southeast and Rossman Hill is located west-southwest of Towpath Mountain.

References

Mountains of Schoharie County, New York
Mountains of New York (state)